The Battle of Nesbit Moor (or Nisbet Muir) was a small but significant clash between Scottish and English forces in the borders area north of the River Tweed. Specifically this clash took place on the Kimmerghame Estate in a field now named Slaughter Field. The estate is in the possession of the Swinton Family.

In 1402, Scottish nobles launched a coordinated invasion of Northern England. In the initial foray, some 12,000 Scottish troops crossed into Cumberland and looted areas near Carlisle. On 22 June at Nisbet, Berwickshire, the forfeited George de Dunbar, 10th Earl of March successfully led 200 English soldiers, mainly drawn from the garrison at Berwick-upon-Tweed, against 400 Scots returning from a raid on Northumberland. Henry IV of England was given news of the skirmish while at Harborough on 30 June, and delayed plans to suppress a Welsh rebellion so that he could deal with the large-scale Scottish invasion that was then imminently expected. In the autumn a large army of Scots led by Archibald Douglas, 4th Earl of Douglas harassed the English countryside as far south as the River Wear, and were engaged and defeated in the battle of Humbleton Hill.

The Scottish casualties at Nesbit Moor included the death of Sir Patrick Hepburn younger of Hailes; and the capture of Sir John Haliburton of Dirleton, Robert de Lawedre of Edrington, Sir John Cockburn, and Sir Thomas Haliburton. The date of Sir Robert Lawder's liberation does not appear to be on record but as there is a charter in The Great Seal of Scotland (number 934) confirmed at Falkland Palace in May 1411, which mentions him being "present", we might safely assume that he was freed before that date. Certainly on 15 June 1411 "Robertus Lawedyr, miles" has a safe-conduct from Henry IV.

References 

 Fordun's Scotichronicon, Vol 8, 1390–1430, edited by D.E.R. Watt, from the Latin manuscript authored by Bower in the 1440s. Edinburgh, The Mercat Press, 1987.
 Nisbet, Alexander, A System of Heraldry, speculative and practical: With the true art of blazon; according to the most approved heralds in Europe: Illustrated with suitable examples of the most considerable surnames and families in Scotland, Edinburgh, 1722.
 Sir James Balfour, Annals, volume 1.
 Fordun's Scotichronicon, Edinburgh, 1759.
 Cockburn-Hood, Thomas H., The House of Cockburn of that Ilk and Cadets Thereof, Edinburgh, 1888, page 43–4.
 Wylie, J. H., History of England under Henry the Fourth, reprinted from an 1884 London edition, New York, 1969, AMS, p. 290.
 Sir James Balfour Paul, The Scots Peerage, Edinburgh, 1905, pps:137/8, where it is stated that the Sir Patrick Hepburn of Hailes who died at this battle was "younger of Hailes", the son, not the father who survived him.

1402 in England
1402 in Scotland
Battles between England and Scotland
Conflicts in 1402